Louis George Alexander (15 January 1932 – 17 June 2002) (commonly referred to as L. G. Alexander) was a British teacher and the author of numerous EFL course books, including New Concept English.

In 1977, he sold 4.7m books, which was recorded in the Guinness Book of Records as the greatest number of copies sold by an individual author in one year (1977).

Biography
Louis Alexander was born Elias George Ftyaras in London. His father, George Ftyaras, was Greek and his mother, Mary Ftyaras née Manolas, was an Australian of Greek ancestry – "so he spoke perfect English and perfect Greek".

During much of World War II he was with his mother in Australia, later they  returned to Britain, where was educated at Godalming Grammar School and the University of London. From 1954 to 1956 he was on national service in the British Army Germany (1954–56), where he had his first experience as an educator, teaching A-level English as an Educational Corps instructor.

He taught English in Germany (1954–56) and Greece (1956–65) where he was head of English at the Protypon Lykeion, Athens (what is now the Scholi Moraïti).

In the 1960s he started being published with Longmans. In 1962 his first book, Sixty Steps to Précis, was published and became a bestseller. His second book, A First Book in Comprehension, was published in 1964. New Concept English, his first major book series, was published in 1967. With Longman he also published such series as: Look Listen and Learn (1968–71), Target (1972–74), Mainline (1973–81).

Louis was a member of the Council of Europe Committee on Modern Language Teaching (1973–78), and one of the authors of The Threshold Level (1975) and Waystage (1977), works developed for the Council of Europe that have been the bases of many communicative language courses and forms the Common European Framework of Reference for Languages. He served on the Committee of Management of the Society of Authors (1980–83).

In the 1980s Alexander wrote reference books such as Longman English Grammar (1988; practice book 1990) and Longman Advanced Grammar (1993).

In the late 1980s he worked for UNESCO on Junior English for China course. He created the blueprint for the Survive self-study series (1980–83, reissued 1989) for modern languages and published courses in the field of computer-assisted language learning.

In 1986-88 he was adviser to the University of Cambridge Local Examinations Syndicate for the Cambridge Certificate in English for International Communication.

He was a writer of EFL course materials from the 1960s onwards. Alexander consistently supported the cause of the relatively untrained non-native speaking teacher of English.

Louis Alexander died of leukemia on 17 June 2002 in Chambéry, Savoie, France.

Legacy
Tim Rix, former chairman of the Longman Group, praised Alexander as having "particular abilities and knowledge", combined with a "use of linguistics", which "meshed perfectly well with the requirements of ELT [English language teaching]" in his time.

Alexander had an immense influence on English language teaching in China. In recognition of this, a statue was raised in his honour in the grounds of the "Foreign Language Teaching and Research Press..., one of China’s largest schoolbook publishers". The statue bears the following inscription: "...the man who cracked the linguistic code of the English language and made it learnable for millions of students worldwide through New Concept English and many other course books".

Personal life
Louis Alexander married Athina Voyatsis in Athens in 1956. They had had a daughter, Marianna (born 1961) and a son George (born 1963). Athina died in 1979. Louis married Julia née Mendus in 1980.

Bibliography
His publications include:

Books
 Sixty Steps to Precis (1962)
 Poetry and Prose Appreciation (1963)
 A First Book in Comprehension (1964)
 Essays and Letter Writing (1965)
 A First Book in Comprehension (1965)
 New Concept English (1967)
 For and Against (1968)
 Look, Listen and Learn! (1968–71)
 Operation Mastermind (1971)
 Target (1972–74)
 Mainline (1973–81)
 Follow Me (1979–80)
 Excel (for Egyptian Secondary Schools, 1985)
 Plain English (1987–88)
 Longman English Grammar (1988)
 Longman English Grammar Practice (1990)
 Step by Step 1-3 (1991)
 Longman Advanced Grammar (1993)
 Right Word, Wrong Word (1994)
 K's First Case Good Morning, Mexico Dangerous Game (2000)Note: Many other books by Alexander are listed in his For and Against (1968).

Articles
 "Fads and fashions in English language teaching", English Today, 21: 35-56, 1990.

References

Further reading
 Barry Tomalin, "Seeking the philosopher's stone" (interview transcript), English Today, 7: 17-18, 1986.
 Tom McArthur, "Louis Alexander: We looked, listened and learned", English Today, 72: 3-7, 2002.
 P.-Y. Li, W. Ethridge, X. Yang, and Julia Alexander, "L.G. Alexander: a statue in Beijing", English Today'', 78: 20-25, 2004.

External links
 Louis Alexander on the history of English language teaching in the 20th century (audio recording in ELT Archive, University of Warwick)

1932 births
2002 deaths
Schoolteachers from London
Greek schoolteachers
Writing teachers
Alumni of the University of London
People educated at Godalming Grammar School
Teachers of English as a second or foreign language
People from London